Boesemania is a genus of freshwater fish in the family Sciaenidae. This genus contains the single species Boesemania microlepis. Also known as the Boeseman croaker and smallscale croaker, this fish lives in southeast Asian rivers.

Description
This is a relatively large species.

Distribution
Boesemania microlepis lives in the mainland Southeast Asia (Cambodia, Laos, Vietnam, and Thailand) as well as in Sumatra (Indonesia). It is found in several rivers such as the Mekong, Chao Phraya River, Mae Klong, Nan River, Tha Chin River, and Bang Pakong River.

Habitat and behaviour 
This species appears to be sedentary. It prefers large, flowing rivers. During the peak of the dry season, it spawns in deepwater pools. During this time, common to other croakers, it can be heard to make loud, continuous, croaking sounds.

Diet
Boesemania microlepis eats mostly small fishes and crustaceans such as shrimps.

Threats
Desired as food, and expensive in southern Laos and northeast Cambodia, this species has become increasingly threatened due to overfishing.

References

Sciaenidae
Monotypic freshwater fish genera
Fish of the Mekong Basin
Fish of Cambodia
Freshwater fish of Indonesia
Fish of Laos
Freshwater fish of Sumatra
Fish of Thailand
Fish of Vietnam
Fish described in 1858
Taxa named by Ethelwynn Trewavas